Luigi Riccio (1577-6 Jan 1643) was a Roman Catholic prelate who served as Bishop of Vico Equense (1627–1643).

Biography
Luigi Riccio was born in Naples, Italy in 1577. On 20 Dec 1627, he was appointed during the papacy of Pope Paul V as Bishop of Vico Equense. 
On 30 Jan 1628, he was consecrated bishop by Giacomo Theodoli, Archbishop of Amalfi.
He served as Bishop of Vico Equense until his death on 6 Jan 1643.

References

External links and additional sources
 (for Chronology of Bishops) 
 (for Chronology of Bishops)  

17th-century Italian Roman Catholic bishops
Bishops appointed by Pope Paul V
1577 births
1643 deaths
Clergy from Naples
16th-century Neapolitan people
17th-century Neapolitan people